"Jingle Jangle Jingle", also known as 'I've Got Spurs That Jingle Jangle Jingle", is a song written by Joseph J. Lilley and Frank Loesser, and published in 1942.  It was featured in that year's film The Forest Rangers, in which it was sung by Dick Thomas.

The most commercially successful recording was by Kay Kyser, whose version reached no. 1 in the Billboard charts in July 1942.  Versions were recorded by many other musicians, including Tex Ritter, Gene Autry, Glenn Miller and The Merry Macs.

Members of the Western Writers of America chose it as one of the Top 100 Western songs of all time.

Popular culture
The song was featured in the 1943 World War II-era theatrical Popeye the Sailor short Too Weak to Work, and was also sung by The Sportsmen Quartet: Bill Days (top tenor), Max Smith (second tenor), Mart Sperzel (baritone), and Gurney Bell (bass) in the 1942 Western movie Lost Canyon with Hopalong Cassidy (Bill Boyd).

It was also featured in the Famous Studios Kartunes series, in a short entitled Snooze Reel, where audiences were invited to sing along.

See also
List of number-one singles of 1942 (U.S.)

References

1942 songs
1942 singles
Number-one singles in the United States
Songs written by Frank Loesser